Henry Ephraim Robins (1827–1917) was the eighth President of Colby College, Maine, United States, from 1873–1882.

Early life
Henry Ephraim Robins was born in Hartford, Connecticut on September 30, 1827. He pursued studies at the Suffield Literary Institute and the Fairmount Theological Seminary in Kentucky.

He died at his daughter's home in Greenfield, Massachusetts on April 23, 1917.

References

External links
Colby.edu

1827 births
1917 deaths
Presidents of Colby College